Floriston is an unincorporated community and census-designated place in Nevada County, California. Formerly an important railroad stop and mill town, Floriston survives to this day as a small residential community. The population was 73 at the 2010 census.

Name
The name comes from the flowers at the place. It is probably coined from the Latin or Spanish stem flor 'flower.'

History
The railroad station was established in the 1870s with the name of Bronco after the name of the creek a mile to the south. The Floriston post office opened in 1891.

Geography
Floriston is located east of Truckee in the canyon of the Truckee River, a short distance north of the bend where it turns north from its previous eastward course. The community is located on a small gently sloped area on the east bank of the river next to Interstate 80, which crosses the river nearby. Steep canyon walls thousands of feet high rise up from the river on both sides.

Climate
Floriston has a dry-summer continental climate (Köppen Dsb) with a moderate amount of precipitation, much of it falling as snow in the wintertime. Diurnal temperature variation is large, with average highs above freezing year-round, and quite cold nighttime temperatures even in midsummer. The community, deep in a canyon on the eastern slope of the Sierra Nevada, experiences a moderate rain shadow effect due to the Sierra crest  to the west. However, this rain shadow is much less pronounced than that of the lower terrain to the east. As a result, Floriston is located in a transition zone between the lush forests of the Sierra and the desert valleys to the east.

Demographics
The 2010 United States Census reported that Floriston was home to 73 people. The population was spread out among 38 households, including 18 families. 6 households included children under the age of 18. Of the 73 people who lived in Floriston, 67 were white, 4 were Native American, and 2 were of mixed-race origin. The community had 9 people under the age of 18, and 8 people aged 65 or older.  The median age was 49.1 years. There were 35 males and 38 females.

Politics
California is an overwhelmingly Democratic state, and its representation in the Senate reflects that the state's Senators, Dianne Feinstein and Kamala Harris, are both Democrats. However, befitting its location in the rural and conservative-leaning Sierra Nevada, Floriston is represented by Republicans in the House of Representatives at the federal level and in both legislative bodies at the state level.

Like much of the Truckee–Tahoe area, with its large population of transplants and seasonal residents from the San Francisco Bay Area, Floriston itself leans strongly Democratic. In the 2016 election, voters in Floriston's voting precinct, which also encompasses other rural areas east of Truckee, cast 69 votes for Hillary Clinton and 37 votes for Donald Trump.

Government

As an unincorporated community, Floriston has no government institutions of its own. Governmental duties are handled by Nevada County. Floriston is located in Nevada County's 5th supervisorial district, represented by Democrat Richard Anderson.

References

External links

Census-designated places in Nevada County, California
Census-designated places in California